Julia Louise Lopez (née Dockerill) is a British Conservative Party politician who has served as Member of Parliament (MP) for Hornchurch and Upminster in Greater London since the 2017 general election. She has also served as Minister of State for Media, Data and Digital Infrastructure since September 2022, and previously served from September 2021 to July 2022 in the Johnson Government. 

Before entering the House of Commons, she served as a local councillor on the Tower Hamlets London Borough Council, and a parliamentary aide.

Early life
Julia Louise Dockerill was born in Harlow and grew up in Stansted Mountfitchet, Essex, with her two sisters. Her mother was a primary school teacher and her father was a businessman. She attended Bentfield Primary School, then The Hertfordshire and Essex High School in Bishop's Stortford, Hertfordshire, before going up to Queens' College, Cambridge, where she read Social and Political Sciences.

Career
From 2006, she worked as a researcher in the parliamentary office of then-MP for Cities of London and Westminster and Conservative Party Vice-Chairman, Mark Field. She became his chief of staff and co-authored two of his books Between the Crashes and The Best of Times. Lopez has also worked as a ghostwriter. While Lopez was Field's parliamentary aide she was photographed in November 2016 carrying confidential notes on a Brexit-related meeting in Downing Street which indicated that the UK would not stay in the single market, and would not seek a transitional deal with the EU.
 
In 2014, Lopez was elected a councillor for St Katharine's and Wapping ward on Tower Hamlets London Borough Council. In April 2017, she was selected as the Conservative candidate for Hornchurch and Upminster. The seat had been previously represented by Conservative MP Angela Watkinson since its formation in 2010 who had also represented the earlier constituency of Upminster since 2001. Lopez was elected to Parliament at the 2017 general election with a majority of 17,723 (31.6%) votes. From September 2017, she sat on the Parliamentary International Trade Select Committee.

Lopez supported Brexit in the 2016 United Kingdom European Union membership referendum. She voted against then Prime Minister Theresa May's Brexit withdrawal agreement in early 2019. In the indicative votes on 27 March, she voted against a referendum on a withdrawal agreement. In October, Lopez voted for Prime Minister Boris Johnson's Brexit withdrawal agreement. At the December 2019 general election, she was returned with 65.8% of the vote, and an increased majority of 23,308 (43.2%) votes.

Lopez was Parliamentary Secretary at the Cabinet Office from February 2020 to September 2021. She was then made Minister of State for Media and Data at the 2021 British cabinet reshuffle.

On 6 July 2022, Lopez resigned from government, citing Boris Johnson's handling of the Chris Pincher scandal, in a joint statement with fellow Ministers Kemi Badenoch, Neil O'Brien, Lee Rowley and Alex Burghart. She then supported Kemi Badenoch in the July 2022 Conservative Party leadership election.

In September 2022, Prime Minister Liz Truss reappointed her to government as a minister at the Department for Digital, Culture, Media and Sport. In October 2022, she was reappointed by Truss' successor Rishi Sunak.

Personal life
She married in September 2017 and the couple have a daughter born in October 2019.

See also 
 Cabinet Office

Notes

References

External links

1984 births
Living people
People from Harlow
People from Essex
Alumni of Queens' College, Cambridge
Councillors in the London Borough of Tower Hamlets
UK MPs 2017–2019
UK MPs 2019–present
21st-century British women politicians
Conservative Party (UK) MPs for English constituencies
Conservative Party (UK) councillors
Female members of the Parliament of the United Kingdom for English constituencies
21st-century English women
21st-century English people
Women councillors in England
British Eurosceptics